Robert Volk (born 30 August 1965) is a retired Slovenian footballer who played as a goalkeeper. He is the goalkeeping coach at Koper.

Playing career
Volk was called up one time by the Slovenia national team, but was an unused substitute in a 1998 FIFA World Cup qualification match against Bosnia and Herzegovina.

At the end of his playing career, Volk was both playing and serving as the goalkeeping coach for Olimpija Ljubljana in the Slovenian lower tiers. In the spring of 2009, he decided to retire as a player in order to free up a first-team spot for Jan Oblak, who at the time was a 16-year-old academy goalkeeper. Volk made 156 top-flight appearances during his career, with 138 of those coming in the Slovenian PrvaLiga.

References

1965 births
Living people
Slovenian footballers
Association football goalkeepers
FC Koper players
ND Gorica players
NK Mura players
NK Rudar Velenje players
NK Primorje players
Sint-Truidense V.V. players
NK Olimpija Ljubljana (2005) players
Slovenian PrvaLiga players
Slovenian Second League players
Belgian Pro League players
Slovenian expatriate footballers
Expatriate footballers in Belgium
Slovenian expatriate sportspeople in Belgium